Jupiter was a  74-gun ship of the line of the French Navy.

Career 
In 1790, under Captain Belugat, Jupiter was part of the 1st Division of the Brest squadron, under Du Chilleau de La Roche, along with Apollon and the 32-gun frigate Surveillante, under Sarcé. In August 1790, Captain Gouzillon de Bélizal took command, which he retained until 1791.

Between 1791 and 1793, Jupiter was based in Saint-Domingue. In March 1794, she was renamed Montagnard. On 29 May, during the May 1794 Atlantic campaign, she encountered a British squadron; in the ensuing battle, she sustained damage which prevented her from taking part in the subsequent battle of the Glorious First of June itself.

She was renamed Démocrate on 18 May 1795, and back to Jupiter on 30 May.

She was renamed Batave on 27 April 1798. The next year, she took part in the Cruise of Bruix.

Condemned in 1807, she was broken up in Brest.

Sources and references 
 Notes

References

 Bibliography
 

External links
 

Ships of the line of the French Navy
Téméraire-class ships of the line
1789 ships